Gudbrand Østbye (2 October 1885 – 2 June 1972) was a Norwegian army officer and historian. He was born in Gjøvik, a son of factory owner Anders Østbye and Ellen Anna Hovdenak. He was married to Ragna Heyerdahl Hørbye, and thus son-in-law of Ragna Hørbye. During the Norwegian Campaign in 1940, he was in command of the 4th Brigade. Among his publications are Krigen i Valdres from 1946, and two volumes of the series Krigen i Norge 1940. He was decorated with the St. Olav's Medal With Oak Branch, and was a Knight of the Order of the Sword.

References

1885 births
1972 deaths
People from Gjøvik
Norwegian Army personnel of World War II
Norwegian military historians
Recipients of the St. Olav's Medal with Oak Branch
Knights of the Order of the Sword
Norwegian prisoners of war in World War II
World War II prisoners of war held by Germany